The Story of Qiu Ju is a 1992 Chinese comedy-drama film. The film was directed by Zhang Yimou and, as in many of his films, stars Gong Li in the title role. The screenplay is an adaption of Chen Yuanbin's (陈源斌) novella The Wan Family's Lawsuit (万家诉讼).

The film tells the story of a peasant woman, Qiu Ju, who lives in a rural area of China. When her husband is kicked in the groin by the village head, Qiu Ju, despite her pregnancy, travels to a nearby town, and later a big city to deal with its bureaucrats and find justice.

The film was selected as the Chinese entry for the Best Foreign Language Film at the 65th Academy Awards, but was not accepted as a nominee. The film was a hit at film festivals and won the Golden Lion award at the Venice Film Festival in 1992.

Plot 
Qiu Ju is a peasant who lives in a small farming enclave with her husband Qinglai. She is in the final trimester of her pregnancy. One day while her husband is conversing to Wang Shantang, the head of the community, a miscommunication ensues. The leader feels insulted and beats Qinglai, kicking him so severely in the groin that he must see a doctor and be absent from work.

Qiu Ju goes to the local police office and complains. The policeman makes the village chief pay 200 yuan to Qinglai. When Qiu Ju goes to the headman, he insultingly throws the 200 yuan notes onto the ground and refuses to apologize. Qiu Ju then goes to the provincial capital accompanied by her husbands' younger sister, Meizi. By luck the two women find lodging at a cheap hotel. The two women meet the district police chief and he promises them that their case will be reviewed.

The new verdict from the district police is that this time the village headman must pay 250 yuan. He still refuses to apologize and so Qiu Ju goes back to the big city and finds a lawyer who takes the case and files suit under a new law.

The case is judged by the court as having been correctly resolved by the district, and so the fine remains at 250 yuan. Qiu Ju is unhappy but all she can do is make yet another appeal to an even higher level of police investigation. As part of the suit, officials come to the village and Qiu Ju's husband is X-rayed at the local hospital.

It's now the middle of winter, and Qiu Ju goes into labor. When sought for help, the headman, together with a group of local men, carries Qiu Ju to the hospital, where she gives birth safely to a healthy baby boy.

A month later the whole village is invited to the "one-month party" for the baby. Qiu Ju and her husband invite the village chief too for his help in saving Qiu Ju's life. However, he doesn't come, and the new parents are worried that he has not accepted their attempt at burying the hatchet. This is proven to not be the case, as the local policeman shows up to tell Qiu Ju that the X-rays has revealed that her husband suffered a broken rib. As a result, the village chief has been arrested, and been sent to jail on a fifteen-day-term.

Qiu Ju tries to stop the police from taking the headman away but never even sees them, and the movie ends with Qiu Ju looking anguished.

Production
The film was set in present-day China (1992) in northwest Shaanxi province (an area which the director would return to in his film The Road Home). Many of the street scenes in the cities were filmed with a hidden camera so the images are a sort of documentary of China during the time of Deng Xiaoping. As film critic Roger Ebert said "along the way we absorb more information about the lives of ordinary people in everyday China than in any other film I've seen."

Home media
The Story of Qiu Ju has been released several times on DVD. In the United States, the first release on Region 1 DVD was by Columbia/TriStar Studio on July 20, 2000.

More recently, the film was re-released by Sony Pictures Classics as part of their Zhang Yimou collection (which also included new versions of Ju Dou and Raise the Red Lantern) on March 28, 2006. Both versions include subtitles in English.

An older, VHS cassette version of the film was also released in the United States by Sony Pictures on January 17, 1995.

Awards and nominations
 Venice Film Festival, 1992
 Golden Lion
 OCIC Award - Honorable Mention
 Volpi Cup — Best Actress, Gong Li
 Vancouver International Film Festival, 1992
 Most Popular Film
 Changchun Film Festival, 1992
 Golden Deer
 Golden Rooster Awards, 1993
 Best Actress — Gong Li
 Best Film
 Hundred Flowers Awards, 1993
 Best Film
 French Syndicate of Cinema Critics, 1993
 Critics Award — Best Foreign Film, Zhang Yimou
 Independent Spirit Awards, 1994
 Best Foreign Film — Zhang Yimou
 National Society of Film Critics Awards, 1994
 Best Foreign Language Film
 Time Out 100 best Chinese Mainland movies – #44
 Included in The New York Times's list of The Best 1000 Movies Ever Made in 2004

See also
 List of submissions to the 65th Academy Awards for Best Foreign Language Film
 List of Chinese submissions for the Academy Award for Best Foreign Language Film

References

External links
 
 
 
 

1992 films
Films based on Chinese novels
Golden Rooster Best Film recipients
Golden Lion winners
1990s Mandarin-language films
1992 comedy-drama films
Films directed by Zhang Yimou
Films with screenplays by Liu Heng
Chinese comedy-drama films
Sony Pictures Classics films